Marie Devereux (27 November 194030 December 2019) was a British model and film actress.

She was born Patricia Sutcliffe  on 27 November 1940 in Edmonton, London.

Marie Devereux became a regular and very popular nude model in magazines during the 1950s. She was photographed by George Harrison Marks. She had a brief career in cinema, starting in late 1950s usually as a sexy girl in comedies, dramas and horror films, but under the direction of distinguished filmmakers. After appearing in Terence Young’s "Serious Charge" and Stanley Donen's "Surprise Package", Devereux was seen to good advantage in three Hammer Film Productions: first, for genre master Terence Fisher, she played a follower of goddess Kali in “The Stranglers of Bombay” (1959), and was one of  "The Brides of Dracula" (1960); followed in 1962 by John Gilling's "The Pirates of Blood River", in which she played a married woman who is having an affair with a sailor, played by Kerwin Mathews. She was also in Guy Green's praised drama "The Mark" (1961), and then travelled to Italy to work as Elizabeth Taylor's stand-in in Cleopatra (1963), directed by Joseph L. Mankiewicz. Devereux went to Hollywood after the production closed in Rome, and appeared in Samuel Fuller's cult melodramas "Shock Corridor" (1963) and most notably in "The Naked Kiss" (1964), in which she had a sizeable supporting role. After The Naked Kiss in 1964, she retired from acting, to get married and raise a family.

Devereux died in Meridian, Idaho, United States on 30 December 2019.

Selected filmography
The Woman Eater (1958)
Grip of the Strangler (1958)
I Only Arsked! (1958)
Serious Charge (1959)
The Stranglers of Bombay (1959)
The Treasure of San Teresa (1959)
Surprise Package (1960)
The Brides of Dracula (1960)
His and Hers (1961)
Dentist on the Job (1961)
The Singer Not the Song (1961)
The Mark (1961) 
Only Two Can Play (1962)
The Pirates of Blood River (1962)
Cleopatra (1963) 
Shock Corridor (1963)
The Naked Kiss (1964)

References

External links
 

1940 births
British female models
British actresses
2019 deaths